Fluxweed is a common name for several plants and may refer to:

Descurainia sophia, a member of the family Brassicaceae
Trichostema brachiatum, a plant endemic to North America